Tehran Milad Tower Metro Station (Also transcribed as Borj-e Milad-e Tehran) is a station in Tehran Metro Line 7. It is located on the grounds of the International Trade and Convention Center of Tehran around Milad Tower and next to Milad Hospital. The station is currently the second to last station  of Line 7 towards the northwest.

Building and Facilities

References

Tehran Metro stations